The Volleyball competitions at the 2001 Southeast Asian Games was held from 9 to 16 September 2001 in Kuala Lumpur, Malaysia. This edition featured both tournaments for men's and women's team. All matches were held in Kuala Lumpur Badminton Stadium.

Medalists

Men's tournament
All times are Malaysia Standard Time (UTC+08:00)

Round robin

Knockout stage

Semi-finals

Bronze-medal match

Gold-medal match

Final standing

Women's tournament
All times are Malaysia Standard Time (UTC+08:00)

Preliminary round

Group A

Group B

Knockout stage

Semi-finals

Fifth place match

Bronze-medal match

Gold-medal match

Final standing

References

2001 Southeast Asian Games events
2001 in volleyball
Volleyball at the Southeast Asian Games